Joseph Ernest Harrison (6 January 1903 – 16 September 1977) was an Australian rules footballer who played with Essendon in the Victorian Football League (VFL).

Family
His brother, Henry Hopetoun "Harry" Harrison (1901–1972) also played VFL football.

Football
Harrison was a member of a premiership side in his debut season with Essendon, playing at half back in the club's 1923 Grand Final win. He went on to play 64 games for Essendon, winning their Best and Fairest award in 1926.

See also
 1927 Melbourne Carnival

Notes

References
 Maplestone, M., Flying Higher: History of the Essendon Football Club 1872–1996, Essendon Football Club, (Melbourne), 1996.

External links

1903 births
1977 deaths
Australian rules footballers from Melbourne
Essendon Football Club players
Essendon Football Club Premiership players
Crichton Medal winners
One-time VFL/AFL Premiership players
People from Preston, Victoria